Pekka Juutilainen (born 3 December 1940) is a Finnish former middle-distance runner. He competed in the men's 800 metres at the 1964 Summer Olympics.

References

External links
 

1940 births
Living people
Athletes from Helsinki
Finnish male middle-distance runners
Olympic athletes of Finland
Athletes (track and field) at the 1964 Summer Olympics